is a Japanese character designer and director of numerous anime series and video games who also goes by the pseudonym . His directorial work includes Parasite Dolls, the anime sequence in Kill Bill: Volume 1, and the Moondrive segment of Genius Party Beyond. He has designed characters for many anime, such as Ashita no Nadja and Samurai Champloo, for which he also served as animation director. In addition to his work with anime, he designed the characters of Tales of Legendia and was the animation director of Devil Kings. Throughout his career, he has worked also as an animator, providing key animations to anime such as The Animatrix's "Kid's Story" and "A Detective Story". He has made two appearances at anime conventions in the United States: at Otakon in 1999 and 2006. He also animated the Joe Hahn-directed music video for the Linkin Park song "Breaking the Habit."

Filmography

TV series
El-Hazard (1995) – character design, chief animation director
Tenchi in Tokyo (1997) – character design, chief animation director
Black Heaven (1999) – character design
Final Fantasy: Unlimited (2001) – character design
Ashita no Nadja (2003) – character design
Samurai Champloo (2004) – character design, screenplay & storyboard & chief animation director (ep 15)
Yurururu ~Nichijou Hen~ (2007) – director
House of Five Leaves (2010) – character design, chief animation director (ep 4)
Terror in Resonance (2014) – character design, chief animation director (ep 1-7)
Days (2016) – character design
B:The Beginning (2018) - character design, key animation supervisor, creator, director
Fena: Pirate Princess (2021) – creator, director

Films
Hells Angels (2008) – character design
Genius Party Beyond: Moondrive (2008) – director, character design
Musashi: The Dream of the Last Samurai (2009) – character design
COMEDY SKIT (Hitman) 1989 (2015) – director

OVAs/ONAs
El Hazard: The Magnificent World (1995) – character design
Starship Girl Yamamoto Yohko (1996) – character design
Battle Arena Toshinden (1996) – character design
Starship Girl Yamamoto Yohko II (1997) – character design
El Hazard 2: The Magnificent World (1997) – character design
COMEDY (2002) – director
Parasite Dolls (2003) – director
Vassalord (2013) – director
B: The Beginning (2018) – creator, director, character design, chief animation director
B: The Beginning – Succession (2021) – creator, chief director, character design, series composition

Video games
Le Roman de la Reine (1998) – character design
Tales of Legendia (2005) – character design
Asura's Wrath (2012) – director & main character design (ep 15.5)

Music videos
Linkin Park - Breaking the Habit (2004) – director
ASIAN KUNG-FU GENERATION - Atarashii Sekai (2008) – director
supercell - Utakata Hanabi (2010) – director

Bibliography
 El Hazard: The Magnificent World Setting Collection (神秘の世界エルハザード 設定資料集). AIC, 1996. 
 El-Hazard: The Wanderers Setting Collection (神秘の世界エルハザード TVシリーズ 設定資料集). AIC, 1997. 
 Tenchi in Tokyo Setting Collection (新 天地無用! 設定資料集). AIC, 1998. 
 Roman Album: Samurai Champloo. Dark Horse, 2007. 
 Top Creators Teach How to Characters (トップクリエイターが教えるキャラクターの創り方『サムライチャンプルー』『エルゴプラクシー』にみるアニメーション制作現場). MC Press, 2007. 
 B: The Beginning Artworks (B: The Beginning アートワークス). PIE International, 2019.

References

External links

 
 Production IG Interview: "The Making of Asience 5"

Japanese animators
Japanese animated film directors
Japanese music video directors
Anime directors
Anime character designers
Living people
1968 births
People from Niigata Prefecture